Darryl Raymond Payne (born in 1960) is an American post-disco record producer and songwriter who worked on club and urban hits of artists like Sharon Redd or Sinnamon. He produced music mostly centered to SAM and Prelude record labels in the 1980s, and Warner Bros, Sony BMG, and EMI in the 2010s.

Production
After becoming dissatisfied with the music business Payne took a long hiatus of 10 years. Later, in the 2000s, Payne was then CEO of Classic World Productions and president of a now-dissolved company Jenstar Entertainment, Inc., formed by Richard W. Kuhn. About his return to music production, Payne adds "everybody is imitating everybody else—it all sounds a like. It's time to get back to the basics, the core of soul music." The company specialized in reissuing DVD versions of vintage TV programs featuring 1950s and 1960s performers like Judy Garland, The Four Tops, Little Richard or Tom Jones.

Albums

Songs

References

1961 births
Living people
People from Aurora, Illinois
African-American record producers
Record producers from Illinois
African-American songwriters
American music arrangers
American male composers
21st-century American composers
Post-disco musicians
Songwriters from Illinois
21st-century American male musicians
21st-century African-American musicians
20th-century African-American people
American male songwriters